The Payze was an English automobile manufactured at Cookham, Berkshire from 1920 until 1921.  The car, which cost £450 in 1920, ran on a 10 hp Coventry-Simplex engine.

See also
 List of car manufacturers of the United Kingdom

References
David Burgess Wise, The New Illustrated Encyclopedia of Automobiles.

Defunct motor vehicle manufacturers of England
Companies based in Berkshire